Bhuvaneshvari (Sanskrit: भुवनेश्वरी, IAST: Bhuvaneśvarī) is a Hindu goddess. She is the fourth amongst the ten Mahavidya goddesses in Shaktism, and one of the highest aspects of Mahadevi. She is identified as Adi Parashakti in the Devi Bhagavatam.

Etymology
The word Bhuvaneshvari is a compound of the words Bhuvana Iśwari, meaning "Goddess of the world" or "Queen of the universe", where the worlds are the tri-bhuvana or three regions of bhūḥ (Earth), bhuvaḥ (atmosphere) and svaḥ (Heavens).

Forms 
According to the Devi Bhagavata Purana, the goddess offers the five manifestations of the Pancha Prakriti:
 Durga
 Lakshmi
 Saraswati
 Gayatri
 Radha

Temples

There are several temples dedicated to Bhuvaneshvari across India. In South India most of the Srividhya tradition upasaka worship her. In Kerala she is also popular among Shaktas.
 Sacred Adishakti Bhuvaneswari Devi Shakti Peetha temple in Bilkhet near Satpuli, Pauri Garhwal, Uttarakhand. This Temple is the most sacred destination of Uttarakhand for the mass of devotees. On the occasion of Navratri, a big fair is organized by the temple authority.
 Lord Indra worshipped Sri Bhuvaneshvari to atone for his sins, after being cursed with vulvas all over his body. Sri Bhuvaneshvari turned the vulvas into eyes and is called Indrakshi ("Indra-eyed") after this incident. Also  her Shakti Peetha is located in Nainativu (Manipallavam) in the Nainai Sri Nagapoosani Ambal Temple– off the shore of the Jaffna Peninsula in Northern Sri Lanka. Shakti's anklets are believed to have fallen here.
 She is worshipped as the patron goddess of Bhubaneswar and by Utkala Brahmins of Odisha.

There is a temple dedicated to Bhuvaneshvari in Coimbatore at Nanvur Piruvu, Vadavalli, CoimbatoreA Natmandir dedicated to the goddess can be found in Hatkhola Chandannagar where the goddess is worshipped annually for a month in the month of Sravan. Here the image of the goddess is built in traditional Bengali style flanked by Shiva and other gods.
 Another temple dedicated to Bhuvaneshvari is located in Pudukkottai, Tamil Nadu.
 A small shrine is also dedicated to her inside Jagannath Temple, Puri and Devi Subhadra is worshipped as Bhuvaneshvari.
 The Samaleswari shrine and Cuttack Chandi Temple in Odisha two are dedicated to her.
 The oldest temple of Bhuvaneshvari devi is located at Gunja, ta: visnagar, dist: mehsana, north Gujarat . Where the function of Mataji's palli held on the auspicious occasion ( Aatham of Navratri).
 A dedicated temple of Bhuvaneshvari Devi is located at Gondal in Gujarat which was established in 1946.
Nochipra Bhagavathy-Kshetram temple located at Westhill, Calicut in Kerala is a 950+ years old temple where the main deity is Bhuvaneshwari Amma, the supreme mother.
 The Kamakhya Temple houses a Bhuvaneshwari shrine. 
 Bhuvaneshvari is also known to be the goddess of Karnataka or Mother Karnataka (ಕರ್ನಾಟಕ ಮಾತೆ) and the Bhuvaneshvari Temple at the historical city of Badami is one of the oldest temples.
 There is a temple dedicated to Bhuvaneshvari Devi, situated in the small town of Jamshedpur, at a place called Telco. Locals believe the temple to be quite powerful, and the temple sees devotees making promises of sarees to the Goddess, in return for granting their prayers. A powerful temple of Bhuvaneshvari is situated in choorakkodu, Adoor near Vellakulangara.
 There is a temple dedicated to Bhuvaneshvari Devi, situated at the bank of the river Krishna at Bhilawadi in Sangli district of Maharashtra. 

 In Northern India, Mathura the city of Krishna also has a centuries-old "Bhuvaneshvari Mahavidya" temple just opposite to Krishna Janmbhoomi.
 One more Temple in Maharashtra, Shri shetra Audumber, Sangli district.
 In Bekhli village, Kullu district, Himachal Pradesh, there is a dedicated temple to Devi Bhuvneshvari where she is known as Mata Bhuvneshvari Jagannathi.  The temple is constructed of wood with carvings on the exterior.  Fairs are held there in respect to the deity twice a year.
 At Lingaraj Temple in Bhubaneswar, Odisha, there is a small temple dedicated to Maa Bhuvaneshvari.
 In North America, Bhuvaneshvari is worshipped at Parashakthi Temple in Pontiac, Michigan.
 In Sydney, Australia, Bhuvaneshvari is worshipped at Shri Shiva Mandir in Minto, NSW.

See also
 Devi
 Mahavidya
 Pattambalam
 Lingaraj Temple
 Bhuvaneshwari Temple Siddapur, Uttarakannada

References

Further reading
 Tantric Yoga and the Wisdom Goddesses by David Frawley
Hindu Goddesses: Vision of the Divine Feminine in the Hindu Religious Traditions by David Kinsley

Hindu goddesses
Forms of Parvati
Lakshmi
Creator goddesses
Mahavidyas